HNLMS Soemba is a diving support and training vessel in service with the Dutch Navy. The vessel was constructed by Vervaco, Heusden for the Dutch Army as a training vessel for their divers. The current Soemba is the second vessel in the Dutch Navy with this name, following  which was scrapped on 12 July 1985.

Construction and career
Soemba was originally built for the Dutch Army as a training vessel but was transferred to the Dutch Navy in 2009 when their diving schools merged.

The builder of the new ships will be selected in 2024.
 See Auxiliary ship replacement program for more information.

Citations

External links

 Soemba at defensie.nl

Auxiliary ships of the Royal Netherlands Navy
Ships of the Royal Netherlands Army
1989 ships